Molagoottal is a South Indian stew with coconut and lentils as a base. It is a dish unique to the Nairs and Iyers of Kerala.

It is eaten mixed with rice. It substitutes for sambar or other curry. It is different from sambar and other similar dishes in that it is less spicy and does not contain tamarind. Typical vegetables used in making molagoottal are winter melon (white pumpkin), drumstick, squash, cucumbers, sprouted pulses, yams, root vegetables, spinach and green leaves. Nowadays, molagoottal has been adapted to include Western vegetables such as carrots, cabbage and potatoes.

Molagoottal is similar in preparation and texture to the Tamil dish koottu, the difference being that the latter is thicker and uses Bengal gram.

See also 
Kerala cuisine
Tamil cuisine
Indian cuisine
 List of stews

References 

Tamil cuisine
Kerala cuisine
South Indian cuisine
Indian soups and stews
Lentil dishes